There are a number of holy wells dedicated to St Oswald.

These include:

St Oswald's Well, Durham
St Oswald's Well, Great Ayton, North Yorkshire
St Oswald's Well, Kirkoswald, Cumbria
St Oswald's Well, Oswestry, Shropshire
St Oswald's Well, Hermitage Green, Cheshire.

Oswald